Ezekiel 38 is the thirty-eighth chapter of the Book of Ezekiel in the Hebrew Bible or the Old Testament of the Christian Bible. This book contains the prophecies attributed to the prophet/priest Ezekiel, and is one of the Books of the Prophets. This and the following chapter form a section dealing with "Gog, of the land of Magog".

Text
Some early manuscripts containing the text of this chapter in Hebrew are of the Masoretic Text tradition, which includes the Codex Cairensis (dated to 895 CE), the Petersburg Codex of the Prophets (dated to 916 CE), Aleppo Codex (10th century), and Codex Leningradensis (dated to 1008 CE). Only one manuscript of several others of Ezekiel found among the Dead Sea Scrolls contained parts of this chapter, this being the Ezekiel Scroll from Masada (Mas 1d; MasEzek; 1–50 CE) with extant verses 38:1‑4, 7‑8.

There is also a translation into Koine Greek known as the Septuagint, made in the last few centuries BCE. Extant ancient manuscripts of the Septuagint version include Codex Vaticanus (B; ; 4th century), Codex Alexandrinus (A; ; 5th century) and Codex Marchalianus (Q; ; 6th century).

War of Ezekiel 38–39
The account of the War of Ezekiel 38–39 or the War of Gog and Magog in chapters 38 and 39 details how Gog of Magog, meaning "Gog from the Land of Magog" or "Gog from the Land of Gog" (the syllable ma being treated as equivalent to "land" ), and his hordes from the north will threaten and attack the restored land of Israel. The chapters describe how God will make his presence known through an earthquake, and send torrential rains, hailstone, fire, and sulfur - subsequently destroying Gog and Magog. Following the defeat of Gog, God will establish a new Temple where he will dwell forever with his people (chapters 40–48). Theologian David Petersen refers to an underlying theological message, that even so fearsome an enemy as this is ultimately under the control of the God of Israel, since it is God himself who says to Gog, "I will bring you against my land". Ezekiel 39 17-20 Calls to the wild animals of earth, to devour the flesh of Israel's enemies and drinking their blood until they are drunk on it!

Verse 2
 "Son of man, set your face against Gog, of the land of Magog, the prince of Rosh, Meshech, and Tubal, and prophesy against him" (NKJV)
 "Son of man" (Hebrew: בן־אדם -): this phrase is used 93 times to address Ezekiel.
 "Rosh" (Hebrew: ראש : can also be translated as "head" (of human and animal); "top" (of the mountain); "beginning" (of time); "river-head"; "chief" (as in "chief-prince", "chief-priest", head of the family). In conjunction to the preceding word "prince", most English Bibles translates them as "chief prince."

See also

Related Bible passages: Genesis 10, Psalm 83 (describes a similar war), Ezekiel 39, Revelation 20

Notes

References

Bibliography
Blenkinsopp, Joseph. "A history of prophecy in Israel" (Westminster John Knox Press, 1996)
  
 
Bullock, C. Hassell. "An Introduction to the Old Testament Prophetic Books" (Moody Press, 1986)
  
Grabbe, Lester L., and Robert Hakke (eds), "'Every city shall be forsaken': urbanism and prophecy in ancient Israel and the Near East" (Sheffield Academic Press, 2001)

Redditt, Paul L. "Introduction to the Prophets" (Wm. B. Eerdmans Publishing, 2008)

External links

Jewish
Ezekiel 38 Hebrew with Parallel English
Ezekiel 38 Hebrew with Rashi's Commentary

Christian
Ezekiel 38 English Translation with Parallel Latin Vulgate 

38
Jewish eschatology
Eschatology in the Bible
Gog and Magog
Gyges of Lydia